is a Japanese former professional boxer and two-time minimumweight world champion.

Professional career 
Ohashi dropped out of college to begin a professional boxing career, and made his debut in February, 1985, with the Yonekura Boxing Gym. He won the vacant Japanese Light flyweight title in his 6th professional fight, and in December 1986, he challenged Jung-Koo Chang for the WBC Light flyweight title, but lost by TKO in the 5th round. Ohashi reclaimed the Japanese Light flyweight title in January 1988, and challenged Chang for the second time in June of the same year, only to lose again by 8th-round TKO. This was Chang's 15th consecutive defense of the WBC title, and Ohashi was knocked down a total of 7 times in 8 rounds before the referee stopped the contest.

Ohashi challenged Jum-Hwan Choi in January 1990 for the Lineal and WBC Minimumweight title, and won by KO to claim his first world title. This win stopped the streak of 21 losses in a row suffered in world title bouts by Japanese boxers. There had been no Japanese world champions for over a year before Ohashi won the WBC title.

Ohashi defended his title once, before losing to the legendary Ricardo López by TKO in the 5th round. López would go on to defend the WBC title won from Ohashi 22 times, and retire undefeated.

After two years away from the world stage, Ohashi returned to fight WBA Minimumweight champion Hi-Yong Choi in October 1992. Ohashi won a unanimous 12-round decision to claim his second world title. He lost to Chana Porpaoin in his first defense, and was forced into retirement at the age of 27, after it was discovered that he had a detached retina. He ended his career with a record of 19-5-0 (12KOs).

Post-retirement 
After retiring, he created the Ohashi Boxing Gym (Ohashi Promotions) in his hometown, Yokohama, and currently works as a trainer there. Former WBC Super flyweight champion, Katsushige Kawashima, is trained by Ohashi.

In January 2007, Ohashi served as the head trainer of the Japanese team in the BOXING GRAND PRIX 2007 event (held under the partnership of the Teiken Boxing Gym, and Golden Boy Promotions).

He also serves as the president of Japan Pro Boxing Association (JPBA) and its subsidiary body East Japan Boxing Association (JPBA-east).

See also 
 List of Mini-flyweight boxing champions
 List of WBA world champions
 List of WBC world champions
 List of Japanese boxing world champions
 Boxing in Japan

References

External links 
 
 Hideyuki Ohashi - CBZ Profile

|-

|-

1965 births
Living people
World Boxing Association champions
World Boxing Council champions
Mini-flyweight boxers
World mini-flyweight boxing champions
Sportspeople from Yokohama
Japanese boxing trainers
Japanese male boxers
Presidents of the Japan Pro Boxing Association